The ecoregions of Bhutan generally vary according to altitude and precipitation. The dry, plain-like valleys of western and central Bhutan tend to be relatively densely populated and intensely cultivated. The wetter eastern valleys, however, tend to be steeper, narrower ravines. At lower and middle elevations, Indomalayan biomes range from tropical and subtropical forests to temperate coniferous forests. In the northern mountainous regions, Bhutan is largely Palearctic, comprising temperate coniferous forests, montane grasslands and shrublands, and swaths without any ecoregion in its highest glacial elevations.

List of ecoregions
Below is a list of ecoregions in Bhutan.

See also
 Geography of Bhutan
 Valleys of Bhutan
 Glaciers of Bhutan

References

 
Ecoregion
Bhutan